Serdar Böke (born 17 September 1986) is a Turkish freestyle wrestler. In 2018, he won one of the bronze medals in the 92 kg event at the 2018 European Wrestling Championships held in Kaspiysk, Russia.

Career 

In 2013, he won the gold medal in the men's freestyle 84 kg event at the 2013 Mediterranean Games held in Mersin, Turkey. In the same year, he also competed in the men's freestyle 84 kg event at the 2013 World Wrestling Championships held in Budapest, Hungary. He was eliminated in his third match by Taimuraz Friev of Spain.

In 2018, he also competed in the men's freestyle 92 kg at the 2018 World Wrestling Championships in Budapest, Hungary. He was eliminated in his first match by Atsushi Matsumoto of Japan.

Major results

References

External links 
 

Living people
1986 births
Place of birth missing (living people)
Turkish male sport wrestlers
European Wrestling Championships medalists
Competitors at the 2013 Mediterranean Games
Mediterranean Games medalists in wrestling
Mediterranean Games gold medalists for Turkey
20th-century Turkish people
21st-century Turkish people